Three on a Date is a 1978 American made-for-television romantic comedy film directed by Bill Bixby. This movie-of-the-week premiered on ABC on February 17, 1978.

Premise
Four couples are winners on a dating show.

Cast
(in alphabetical order)
June Allyson: Marge Emery
Loni Anderson: Angela Ross
Ray Bolger: Andrew
John Byner: Donald Lumis
Didi Conn: Eve Harris
Gary Crosby: Leonard
Geoff Edwards: Emcee
Carol Lawrence: Joan
Meredith MacRae: Valerie Owens
Rick Nelson: Bob Oakes
Patrick Wayne: Roger Powell
Introducing Forbesy Russell as Stephanie Barrington 
Guest Stars
James Hampton: Ernest
Howard T. Platt: Frank
Richard Libertini: Gabe
And Branscombe Richmond as Allen Lunalilo
Co-Starring
Joe Maross as Warren
Pat Renella as Bobby
Byron Webster as Mr. Plews
John Dorsey as Himself
Featuring
Nancy Cameron as Contestant
Bob Cummings as Cab Driver
Dana House as Contestant
Harlee McBride as Model #1
Denise Michele as Woman
Stanley Ralph Ross as Al
Bonwitt St. Claire as Contestant
Debra Svensk as Beach Girl
Sondra Theodore as Model #2
Cynthia Wood as Stewardess
Uncredited
Danny Thomas: Man at airport
Gregory Barnett: Bachelor #3
Tracey Bregman: Contestant

Production
It was co produced by Danny Thomas.

Reception
The Los Angeles Times called it "a distinct and pleasant surprise".

References

External links

Three on a Date at BFI

1978 television films
1978 films
1978 romantic comedy films
ABC network original films
American television films
American romantic comedy films
Films directed by Bill Bixby
1970s English-language films
1970s American films